Makiabad (also Romanized as Makīābād) is a village in Golzar Rural District, in the Central District of Bardsir County, Kerman Province, Iran. At the 2006 census, its population was 34, in 4 families.

References 

Populated places in Bardsir County